The Brodeur Peninsula is an uninhabited headland on Baffin Island in the Qikiqtaaluk Region of Nunavut, Canada. It is located in the northwestern part of the island and is bounded by Prince Regent Inlet to the west, Lancaster Sound to the north, and Admiralty Inlet to the east. The peninsula is connected to the rest of Baffin Island by a narrow isthmus to the south.

Geography
The habitat is characterized by rocky shores and coastal cliffs, as well as barrens and rocky flats.

Fauna
Northwestern Brodeur Peninsula,  in size, is a Canadian Important Bird Area (#NU065). It is home to the ivory gull, but researchers have been witnessing a dramatic decrease in breeding populations in the region in recent times.

The western side of the Brodeur Peninsula is known as a polar bear mating ground.

Land use
Serious efforts are underway to find minerals in the area.

References

External links
 Brodeur Peninsula at the Atlas of Canada

Peninsulas of Qikiqtaaluk Region
Important Bird Areas of Qikiqtaaluk Region
Important Bird Areas of Arctic islands
Seabird colonies